Full Tension is a satirical comedy show which aired on DD National.

Cast
 Jaspal Bhatti
 Vivek Shauq
 Savita Bhatti
 B. N. Sharma
 Rajesh Jolly
 Kuldeep Sharma
 Brijesh Ahuja
 Sunil Grover
 Ashwani Bhardwaj
 Prem Kakaria

Episodes
 Gifts
 Services and Repairs
 Hotels and Restaurants 
 Politics
 Money Matters
 Law and Order 
 Kitty Party
 Media 
 Transportation 
 Alcoholism 
 Health 
Rainy Season
Unemployment
Beggars
Education

References

Indian comedy television series
1995 Indian television series debuts
DD National original programming